The 2020–21 Colorado College Tigers men's ice hockey season was the 81st season of play for the program and the 8th in the NCHC conference. The Tigers represented Colorado College and were coached by Mike Haviland, in his 7th season.

Season
As a result of the ongoing COVID-19 pandemic the entire college ice hockey season was delayed. Because the NCAA had previously announced that all winter sports athletes would retain whatever eligibility they possessed through at least the following year, none of Colorado College's players would lose a season of play. However, the NCAA also approved a change in its transfer regulations that would allow players to transfer and play immediately rather than having to sit out a season, as the rules previously required.

Colorado College began the season playing a series of games in Omaha, Nebraska. The team started poorly but improved when freshman goaltender Dominic Basse was moved into the starting role. After the initial glut of games in December, CC's record stood at 2–4–2 with the team looking like it could improve with their bevy of new players. After splitting a weekend with then-ranked Denver at the start of January, the offense fell apart. Over the final two months of the shortened season, the Tigers never scored more than 2 goals in a game and they won once in 14 games. The team still managed to finish above last place in the conference and almost levered their position into a shocking upset of St. Cloud State in the conference quarterfinals but the team's paltry offense could not keep them in the game and they weren't able to hold onto their lead.

After the season, head coach Mike Haviland resigned from his position. The move wasn't surprising considering both the overall lack of success under his tenure and the virtually non-existent offense of this season.

Jake Begley, Jackson Ross and Casey Staum sat out the season

Departures

Recruiting

Roster
As of March 1, 2021.

Standings

Schedule and Results

|-
!colspan=12 style=";" | Regular Season

|-
!colspan=12 style=";" |

Scoring Statistics

Goaltending statistics

Rankings

USCHO did not release a poll in week 20.

Awards and honors

References

Colorado College Tigers men's ice hockey seasons
Colorado College Tigers
Colorado College Tigers
Colorado College Tigers
Colorado College Tigers
Colorado College Tigers